Savigny-le-Vieux is a commune in the Manche department in Normandy in north-western France.

See also
Savigny Abbey
Communes of the Manche department

References

Savignylevieux